Hartmut Strampe (born 3 March 1956 in Handorf, West Germany) is a former German professional football referee. He was a full international for FIFA from 1993 until 2001. He refereed 1998 DFB-Pokal Final.

References

External links
 Profile at worldfootball.net

1956 births
Living people
German football referees
UEFA Europa League referees